Karaçavuş can refer to:

 Karaçavuş, Amasya
 Karaçavuş, Elâzığ